Eastern Kata-vari also locally known as Shekhani is a variety of the Kata-vari language spoken in Chitral district of Khyber-Pakhtunkhwa province of Pakistan.  The Kamviri language is also known as Shekhani.  The Khowar name for the dialect is Sheikhwar which means "Language of the Sheikhs or converts."  Some linguists consider Shekhani or Eastern Kata-vari a different language due to the isolation from other Nuristani languages other than Kamviri. Kamviri Shekhani is different than Eastern Kata-vari which is also called Shekhani.

In August 2022, Pakistani linguist, Rehmat Aziz Chitrali proposed a keyboard to Khowar Academy, Chitral.

Speakers 
The speakers of Eastern Kata-vari migrated from Kamdesh in Nuristan in modern-day Afghanistan to Lutkuh Valley in Chitrali Princely State in British Raj during the 19th century.  Most Shekhani speakers speak either Pashto or Khowar as a second language.  Many Shekhani speakers often marry the minority Pashtuns in the area.

Phonology

Consonants 

 Sounds /ʒ ɽ ɣ/ occur from neighboring languages. /f x/ are borrowed from loanwords mainly from Khowar or Yidgha.
/ʈ/ can also be heard as an allophone [ɽ].
 [j] is heard as an allophone of /i/.
 /v/ can also be heard as bilabial [β] or a labial approximant [w].

Vowels 

 Mid /ə/ can be heard as a close central [ɨ].

References 

Nuristani languages of Afghanistan
Languages of Chitral